Ross is an unincorporated community in Pope County, Arkansas, United States. It was the principal community in the former Sand Spring Township.

References

Unincorporated communities in Pope County, Arkansas
Unincorporated communities in Arkansas